James Gruen (March 8, 1894, Michigan – March 19, 1967, Woodland Hills, Los Angeles, California) was a Hollywood screenwriter.

James Gruen was married to actress Beatrice Van.

Filmography
 Camera Sleuth (1951)
 South of Death Valley (1949) (story)
 Everybody Sing (1938) (additional dialogue)
 Windjammer (1937)
 Wild Brian Kent (1936)
 The Leathernecks Have Landed (1936) (story)
 Behind the Green Lights (1935)
 The Marines Are Coming (1934) (screenplay)
 In Old Santa Fe (1934) (screenplay)
 Night Parade (1929)
 Hard to Get (1929) (also titles)
 The Girl in the Glass Cage (1929)
 Silks and Saddles (1929) (adaptation)
 Riley the Cop (1928) (story)
 None But the Brave (1928) (story)
 A Prodigal Bridegroom (1926) (story)
 Collegiate (1926) (adaptation)
 Alice Be Good (1926)
 Meet My Girl (1926) (story)
 The Traffic Cop (1926)
Let's Go, Gallagher (1925) (also story)
 Three Bases East (1925) (scenario)

External links
 

1894 births
1967 deaths
American male screenwriters
People from Greater Los Angeles
Film directors from Michigan
Film directors from California
Screenwriters from Michigan
Screenwriters from California
20th-century American male writers
20th-century American screenwriters